Pescadero State Beach is alongside State Route 1, located 14.5 miles south of Half Moon Bay and 1.5 miles west of the city of Pescadero in San Mateo County, California. The beach has a mile-long shoreline with sandy coves, rocky cliffs, tide pools, fishing spots and picnic facilities. 

Across the highway is Pescadero Marsh Natural Preserve, a popular spot for bird watchers and other naturalists.

About 
Pescadero State Beach has two distinct beach areas that are divided by the Pescadero creek. The northern beach is wider and more sandy and the southern beach is more rocky. The northern beach eventually connects to Pomponio State Beach and San Gregorio State Beach, depending on the tide levels. This park is also host to a natural marsh and wetlands area.

The nature preserve is a refuge for steelhead, blue heron, kite, deer, raccoon, fox, skunk, barn swallow, and weasel. A common bird of northern California's rocky shoreline that are seen here too are the black oystercatcher.

The shoreline at the center and southern parking areas is protected from the ocean waves by offshore rocks with numerous tide pools and areas of open water.  This habitat is frequently occupied by both the Steller sea lion and the harbor seal.  These pinnipeds alternately sun themselves by hauling onto the offshore rocks and sliding back into the water to hunt nearby.

No dogs on beach. No camping. No beach fires. Fishermen seek fish and mollusks here, primarily mussels, and a California State fishing license is required for these activities.

See also
List of beaches in California
List of California state parks

References

External links

Official California State Parks webpage
Coastal Images

California State Beaches
Parks in San Mateo County, California
San Francisco Bay Area beaches
Beaches of San Mateo County, California
Beaches of Northern California